Shooting at the 2007 South Pacific Games was held in Samoa from 27–29 August at the Tafaigata Shooting Range near Apia. All medal event took place on the down-the-line shotgun range, although a pistol shooting demonstration event was also hosted.

Led by Theodore Tein-Weiawe, the New Caledonian team dominated the competition and won five gold medals. Fiji also won a gold medal with Glenn Kable taking individual honours in the single barrel event.

Teams
There were six nations competing:

Medal summary

Medal table

Shotgun results
Three down-the-line clay target disciplines were contested and medals were awarded for both individual and team events. The competition was not gender specific, with all events open to men and women. However, all shooters at these games were male.

References

External links

2007 South Pacific Games
2007
Pacific Games